Yad Natan (lit. Memorial for Natan) is a moshav in southern Israel in Hevel Lakhish, near the town of Kiryat Gat. It is part of the Lakhish Regional Council.

History
Moshav Yad Natan was founded in 1953 by Jewish immigrants from the Hungarian youth movement HaNoar HaTzioni who survived the Holocaust. It was named after Ottó Komoly (Natan Kohn), a leader of the Zionist movement in Hungary.

Yad Natan was the first moshav affiliated with the Lachish Regional Council. In 1973, the moshav was joined by 24 families from South America. Most of the residents make a living from agriculture. Roses for export, orchards, vegetable farming and poultry-breeding are the primary economic branches. 

It is on the land of Iraq Suwaydan.

References

Moshavim
Lakhish Regional Council
Populated places established in 1953
Populated places in Southern District (Israel)
1953 establishments in Israel
Hungarian-Jewish culture in Israel